INPP can mean:
 International Public Partnerships, an investment company  
 International Network for Philosophy and Psychiatry 
 Ignalina Nuclear Power Plant
 Inn National Progressive Party, Myanmar 
 Inositol-polyphosphate in chemistry (e.g. in INPP5E)